Golruiyeh (also Romanized as Golrū’īyeh and Golroo’eyeh) is a village in Tarom Rural District, in the Central District of Hajjiabad County, Hormozgan Province, Iran. At the 2006 census, its population was 21, in 4 families.

References 

Populated places in Hajjiabad County